The 1985–86 Cypriot Second Division was the 31st season of the Cypriot second-level football league. Ethnikos Achna FC won their 1st title.

Format
Fourteen teams participated in the 1985–86 Cypriot Second Division. All teams played against each other twice, once at their home and once away. The team with the most points at the end of the season crowned champions. The first two teams were promoted to 1986–87 Cypriot First Division.

Changes from previous season
Teams promoted to 1985–86 Cypriot First Division
 Ermis Aradippou FC
 APOP Paphos FC

Teams relegated from 1984–85 Cypriot First Division
 Omonia Aradippou
 Evagoras Paphos

Teams promoted from 1984–85 Cypriot Third Division
 Orfeas Athienou
 Othellos Athienou FC

Teams relegated to 1985–86 Cypriot Third Division
 Chalkanoras Idaliou
 Digenis Akritas Ipsona

League standings

See also
 Cypriot Second Division
 1985–86 Cypriot First Division
 1985–86 Cypriot Cup

References

Cypriot Second Division seasons
Cyprus
1985–86 in Cypriot football